Nodamuvirales is an order of positive-strand RNA viruses which infect eukaryotes.  The name of the group is a contraction of  "Nodamura virus" and -virales which is the suffix for a virus order.

Taxonomy
The following families are recognized:
Nodaviridae
Sinhaliviridae

References

Viruses